Murraya crenulata is a species of shrub or small tree in the family Rutaceae. Found in Taiwan, Indonesia, Philippines, Papua New Guinea and south western Pacific islands. In Queensland, Australia the species is listed as endangered.

References

crenulata
Flora of Queensland
Flora of Indonesia
Flora of the Philippines
Flora of Oceania
Flora of Taiwan
Flora of Papua New Guinea